Statistics of Liberian Premier League in season 1994.

Overview
It was contested by 15 teams, and National Port Authority Anchors won the championship.

References
Liberia - List of final tables (RSSSF)

Football competitions in Liberia
Lea